Plinia grandifolia, commonly known as  (large jaboticaba), is a species of plant in the family Myrtaceae. It is endemic to south-eastern Brazil, and is found almost exclusively in the under-story of the Atlantic Rainforest. The tree grows to between 4 and 8 metres tall, and produces dark-purple, edible fruit, between 15 and 25mm in diameter.

References

grandifolia
Crops originating from the Americas
Crops originating from Brazil
Tropical fruit
Endemic flora of Brazil
Fruits originating in South America
Cauliflory
Fruit trees
Berries
Plants described in 1994